Platon Halavach (Belarusian, Платон Раманавіч Галавач, ; 1903 – October 29, 1937) was a Belarusian writer. During the Great Purge, he became a victim of the 1937 mass execution of Belarusians.

Bibliography
  Ліўшыц, У. Платон Галавач: лёс чалавека і пісьменніка// Брама. 2016.Вып.4.—  Мн.: С.245-258.
 Луфераў М., Платон Галавач, в кн.: Гiсторыя беларускай савецкай лiтаратуры, т. 1. — Miнск, 1964. 
 Каленкович И. Творчество Платона Головача: (Жанрово-стилевое своеобразие): Автореферат дис. … канд. филол. н. — Мн., 1979;
 ЭГБ, т. 2.

Sources
 ГАЛАВАЧ ПЛАТОН РАМАНАВІЧ 

1903 births
1937 deaths
People from Babruysk District
People from Bobruysky Uyezd
Members of the Central Committee of the Communist Party of Byelorussia
Members of the Central Executive Committee of the Byelorussian Soviet Socialist Republic
Great Purge victims from Belarus
People executed by the Soviet Union
Soviet rehabilitations